The men's singles badminton event at the 2014 Commonwealth Games was held from July 29 to August 3 at the Emirates Arena in Glasgow. The defending gold medalist was Lee Chong Wei of Malaysia, who won in 2006 and 2010. This year, Lee withdrew from the tournament due to an injury.

The athletes were drawn into an elimination stage draw. Once a team lost a match it was no longer able to compete. Each match was contested as the best of three games.

The draw for the competition was done on July 21, 2014.

Seeds
The seeds for the tournament were:

  (Quarterfinals)
  (Champion, gold medalist)
  (Semifinals, fourth place)
  (Quarterfinals)

  (Semifinals, bronze medalist)
  (Final, silver medalist)
  (Quarterfinals)
  (Quarterfinals)

Results

Finals

Top Half

Section 1

Section 2

Bottom Half

Section 3

Section 4

References

Men's singles